The Caribbean Commission, originally the Anglo-American Caribbean Commission, was established on 9 March 1942 to improve the common social and economic problems of the region and deal with wartime issues. In 1946, the governments of the United States and United Kingdom invited France and the Netherlands to join, creating the Caribbean Commission with a central secretariat in Port-of-Spain, Trinidad and Tobago.

See also 
 Moyne Commission

References

International organizations based in the Americas
History of the Caribbean
British West Indies